The 1869 Clare by-election was fought on 5 January 1869.  The by-election was fought due to the incumbent Liberal MP, Sir Colman O'Loghlen, becoming Judge Advocate General.  It was retained by O'Loghlen who was unopposed.

References

1869 elections in the United Kingdom
By-elections to the Parliament of the United Kingdom in County Clare constituencies
Unopposed ministerial by-elections to the Parliament of the United Kingdom (need citation)
January 1869 events
1869 elections in Ireland